German submarine U-2551 was a Type XXI U-boat of Nazi Germany's Kriegsmarine during World War II. The Elektroboote submarine was laid down on 8 December 1944 at the Blohm & Voss yard at Hamburg, launched on 31 March 1945, and commissioned on 24 April 1945 under the command of Kapitänleutnant Gerhard Schaar.

U-2551 was a brand new, high technology electric boat which could run constantly submerged rather than having to surface to recharge her batteries every day the way submarines until that point had had to do. However, these advanced vessels were introduced to the Kriegsmarine only late in 1944, much too late to influence the Battle of the Atlantic, and too late for many of them to serve in an offensive capacity at all.

With the end of the war near, training on U-boats had dropped to a minimum due to lack of fuel, falling morale and the effectiveness of allied attacks on U-boat construction and preparation. The exception to this were the new Type XXI boats, which continued to train in the Baltic Sea.

Design
Like all Type XXI U-boats, U-2551 had a displacement of  when at the surface and  while submerged. The submarine was powered by two MAN SE supercharged six-cylinder M6V40/46KBB diesel engines each providing , two Siemens-Schuckert GU365/30 double-acting electric motors each providing , and two Siemens-Schuckert silent running GV232/28 electric motors each providing .

U-2551 was fitted with six  torpedo tubes in the bow and four  C/30 anti-aircraft guns. She could carry twenty-three torpedoes or seventeen torpedoes and twelve mines. The complement was five officers and fifty-two men.

Fate
U-2551 was deliberately run aground by her crew on 5 May 1945 in a bay named Solitüde of the suburb of Flensburg named Mürwik in N. Germany. Post-war, she was destroyed by the Royal Navy on 23 July 1945, and the wreck broken up.

References

Bibliography

External links
 

World War II submarines of Germany
Type XXI submarines
World War II shipwrecks in the North Sea
U-boats commissioned in 1945
1945 ships
Ships built in Hamburg
Operation Regenbogen (U-boat)
Maritime incidents in May 1945